Grabiąż may refer to the following places in West Pomeranian Voivodeship, Poland:

Nowy Grabiąż
Stary Grabiąż